The 2016 Southern Illinois Salukis football team represented Southern Illinois University Carbondale as a member of the Missouri Valley Football Conference (MVFC) during the 2016 NCAA Division I FCS football season. Led by first-year head coach Nick Hill, the Salukis compiled an overall record of 4–7 with a mark of 2–6 in conference play, placing in a three-way tie for eighth in the MVFC. Southern Illinois played home games at Saluki Stadium in Carbondale, Illinois.

Schedule

Game summaries

at Florida Atlantic

Southeast Missouri State

Murray State

at Northern Iowa

South Dakota State

at Illinois State

Indiana State

at Missouri State

South Dakota

at Youngstown State

Western Illinois

References

Southern Illinois
Southern Illinois Salukis football seasons
Southern Illinois Salukis football